Jerome Joseph Hastrich (November 13, 1914 – May 12, 1995) was an American prelate of the Roman Catholic Church.  He served as the second bishop of the Diocese of Gallup in New Mexico from 1969 to 1990.  He previously served as an auxiliary bishop of the Diocese of Madison in Wisconsin from 1963 to 1969.

Biography

Early life 
Jerome Hastrich was born on November 13, 1914, in Milwaukee, Wisconsin. He was ordained to the priesthood on February 9, 1941, for the Archdiocese of Milwaukee. On December 22, 1945, Hastrich was incardinated into the newly created Diocese of Madison.

Auxiliary Bishop of Madison 
On July 25, 1963, Pope Paul VI appointed Hastrich as an auxiliary bishop of the Diocese of Madison and titular bishop of Gurza.  He was consecrated bishop on September 3, 1963.

Bishop of Gallup 
On August 25, 1969, Paul VI appointed Hastrich as bishop of the Diocese of Gallup . On March 31, 1990, Pope John Paul II accepted Hastrich's resignation as bishop of Gallup. Jerome Hastrich died in Gallup on May 12, 1995.

Notes

1914 births
1995 deaths
Participants in the Second Vatican Council
Roman Catholic Archdiocese of Milwaukee
Roman Catholic Diocese of Madison
People from Madison, Wisconsin
People from Gallup, New Mexico
Catholic Church in New Mexico
Religious leaders from Milwaukee
20th-century Roman Catholic bishops in the United States
Religious leaders from New Mexico
Roman Catholic Diocese of Gallup
Catholics from New Mexico
Catholics from Wisconsin